Judith Evelyn Jyothi Prakash (born 19 December 1951) is a Singaporean judge in the Supreme Court. She was appointed a permanent Judge of Appeal of the Court of Appeal of Singapore on 1 August 2016, the first woman to hold this post. During her time on the bench, she was also Judge of the Dubai International Financial Centre Courts, where she heard appeal matters. 

After graduation from National University of Singapore, she did her pupillage under David Marshall though she initially found the practice of criminal law not something that suited her. Prior to her appointment to the bench, she was a partner specialising in shipping and commercial law in Drew & Napier. Prakash was inducted in 2016 to the Singapore Women's Hall of Fame and has chaired the Raffles' Girls School Board of Governors since 1996. She is also on the Board of Trustees of SINDA. She was, until 2022, the Lead Judge in the Supreme Court for arbitration matters.

Prakash is the chair of the Law Reform Committee and Publications Committee of the Singapore Academy of Law, and also sits on the Medical Litigation Review Committee which examines issues relating to medical litigation.

Prakash was a member of the sub-committee on the Review of Arbitration Laws, appointed by the Attorney-General in 1991, that made recommendations on Singapore's laws relating to international commercial arbitration and which led to the enactment of the International Arbitration Act in 1994.

References

 

Living people
Singaporean Judges of Appeal
Singaporean women lawyers
Singaporean women judges
University of Singapore alumni
1951 births